Carl Peter Henrik Dam , (21 February 1895 – 17 April 1976) was a Danish biochemist and physiologist.

He was awarded the Nobel Prize in Medicine in 1943 for joint work with Edward Doisy in discovering vitamin K and its role in human physiology. Dam's key experiment involved feeding a cholesterol-free diet to chickens. He initially replicated experiments reported by scientists at the Ontario Agricultural College (OAC). McFarlane, Graham and Richardson, working on the chick feed program at OAC, had used chloroform to remove all fat from chick chow. They noticed that chicks fed only fat-depleted chow developed hemorrhages and started bleeding from tag sites. Dam found that these defects could not be restored by adding purified cholesterol to the diet. It appeared that—together with the cholesterol—a second compound had been extracted from the food, and this compound was called the coagulation vitamin. The new vitamin received the letter K because the initial discoveries were reported in a German journal, in which it was designated as Koagulationsvitamin.

He received an undergraduate degree in chemistry from the Copenhagen Polytechnic Institute (now the Technical University of Denmark) in 1920, and was appointed as assistant instructor in chemistry at the School of Agriculture and Veterinary Medicine. By 1923 he had attained the post of instructor in biochemistry at Copenhagen University's Physiological Laboratory. He studied microchemistry at the University of Graz under Fritz Pregl in 1925, but returned to Copenhagen University, where he was appointed as an assistant professor at the Institute of Biochemistry in 1928, and assistant professor in 1929. During his time as professor at Copenhagen University he spent some time working abroad, and in 1934 submitted a thesis entitled Nogle Undersøgelser over Sterinernes Biologiske Betydning (Some investigations on the biological significance of the sterines) to Copenhagen University, and received the degree of Ph.D. in biochemistry.

Between 1942 and 1945 Dam was a senior research associate at the University of Rochester; it was during this period that he was awarded the 1943 Nobel Prize for Physiology or Medicine. In 1951, he was one of seven Nobel Laureates who attended the first Lindau Nobel Laureate Meeting.

See also
 University of Rochester
 List of Nobel Laureates affiliated with the University of Rochester

References

External links 

  including the Nobel Lecture on December 12, 1946 The Discovery of Vitamin K, Its Biological Functions and Therapeutical Application

1895 births
1976 deaths
Danish biochemists
Danish Nobel laureates
Danish physiologists
Nobel laureates in Physiology or Medicine
People from Copenhagen
University of Graz alumni
Academic staff of the University of Copenhagen
Burials at East Bispebjerg Cemetery
Vitamin researchers